Group D of the 2013 FIBA Asia Championship took place from 1 to 3 August 2011. This is the preliminary round of the 2013 FIBA Asia Championship, with the three teams with the best record (Kazakhstan, Bahrain and India) advancing to 2013 FIBA Asia Championship Group F.

Three games will be played at the Ninoy Aquino Stadium in Manila, Philippines, while the other three games will be played at the Mall of Asia Arena at nearby Pasay. Thailand, the last placed team, was relegated to the 13th–15th classification round.

Summary
In Manila, Bahrain defeated India in their opening round via overtime; Mohamed Kawaid scored on a three-pointer to tie the game in regulation, while Mohamed Ebrahim converted a three-pointer of his own at with 49 seconds left in OT to put the Bahrainis up for good. In Pasay, the Kazakhs won when they built a large enough lead at the end of the third quarter that made a comeback from Thailand impossible. In a game of first day winners, the match in Manila went into overtime anew when Jerri Johnson scored on a three-pointer with 15 seconds left. In the overtime, Konstantin Dvirnyy scored the marginal free-throws with 21 seconds left to win the game for Kazakhstan. Elsewhere, India scored an easy win against Thailand in the game held at Pasay. On the final day, Bahrain and Kazakhstan easily beat Thailand and India respectively, qualifying both to the second round; India's win against Thailand the night earlier qualified them for the second round.

Standings

|}

All times are local (UTC+8).'

August 1

India vs. Bahrain

|-
|4 ||align=left|Sambhaji Kadam || 30 || 0/4 || 0 || 0/2 || 0 || 3/6 || 50 || 0 || 4 || 4 || 5 || 3 || 4 || 1 || 0 || 3
|-
|5 ||align=left|Narender Kumar Grewal || 37 || 11/16 || 68.8 || 11/14 || 78.6 || 3/7 || 42.9 || 1 || 2 || 3 || 1 || 0 || 0 || 2 || 0 || 25
|-
|6 ||align=left|Pratham Singh ||colspan=16 align=left|Did not play
|-00
|7 ||align=left|Vinay Kaushik || 3 || 0/1 || 0 || 0/0 || 0 || 0/0 || 0 || 0 || 0 || 0 || 0 || 0 || 0 || 0 || 0 || 0
|-
|8 ||align=left|Arjun Singh ||colspan=16 align=left|Did not play
|-
|9 ||align=left|Vishesh Bhriguvanshi || 43 || 5/13 || 38.5 || 5/12 || 41.7 || 2/3 || 66.7 || 4 || 5 || 9 || 4 || 2 || 4 || 1 || 0 || 12
|-
|10 ||align=left|Amritpal Singh || 42 || 6/20 || 30 || 6/20 || 30 || 2/8 || 25 || 3 || 11 || 14 || 1 || 4 || 5 || 0 || 3 || 14
|-
|11 ||align=left|Joginder Singh || 16 || 2/6 || 33.3 || 0/1 || 0 || 0/0 || 0 || 0 || 1 || 1 || 2 || 5 || 3 || 0 || 0 || 6
|-
|12 ||align=left|Satnam Singh Bhamara ||colspan=16 align=left|Did not play
|-
|13 ||align=left|Amjyot Singh || 35 || 7/12 || 58.3 || 7/12 || 58.3 || 2/2 || 100 || 5 || 9 || 14 || 2 || 5 || 5 || 1 || 0 || 10
|-
|14 ||align=left|Yadwinder Singh || 15 || 0/3 || 0 || 0/1 || 0 || 0/0 || 0 || 1 || 4 || 5 || 0 || 5 || 1 || 0 || 0 || 0
|-
|15 ||align=left|Rikin Shantilal Pethani || 5 || 2/2 || 100 || 2/2 || 100 || 0/0 || 0 || 0 || 0 || 0 || 0 || 2 || 0 || 0 || 0 || 4
|-
|align=left colspan=2|Totals || 225 || 33/77 || 42.9 || 31/64 || 48.4 || 12/26 || 46.2 || 19 || 36 || 55 || 15 || 26 || 22 || 5 || 3 || 80
|}

|-
|4 ||align=left|Mohamed Ebrahim || 36 || 5/16 || 31.2 || 2/7 || 28.6 || 0/0 || 0 || 1 || 1 || 2 || 3 || 3 || 4 || 1 || 0 || 13
|-
|5 ||align=left|Hussain Al-Tawash || 17 || 0/4 || 0 || 0/2 || 0 || 1/2 || 50 || 0 || 3 || 3 || 2 || 1 || 1 || 0 || 0 || 1
|-
|6 ||align=left|Mohamed Kawaid || 44 || 6/12 || 50 || 4/8 || 50 || 11/11 || 100 || 1 || 3 || 4 || 1 || 3 || 2 || 2 || 0 || 25
|-00
|7 ||align=left|Bader Malabes || 18 || 3/6 || 50 || 2/3 || 66.7 || 0/0 || 0 || 0 || 1 || 1 || 0 || 1 || 1 || 0 || 0 || 7
|-
|8 ||align=left|Ahmed Ismaeel || 29 || 3/8 || 37.5 || 2/3 || 66.7 || 4/10 || 40 || 1 || 5 || 6 || 5 || 4 || 3 || 1 || 0 || 11
|-
|9 ||align=left|Mohamed Alderazi || 29 || 3/8 || 37.5 || 1/3 || 33.3 || 2/2 || 100 || 2 || 0 || 2 || 1 || 3 || 2 || 1 || 0 || 10
|-
|10 ||align=left|Ahmed Alderazi || colspan=16 align=left|Did not play
|-
|11 ||align=left|Subah Azzam || 1 || 0/0 || 0 || 0/0 || 0 || 0/0 || 0 || 0 || 0 || 0 || 0 || 0 || 0 || 0 || 0 || 0
|-
|12 ||align=left|Chester Giles || 30 || 6/12 || 50 || 6/12 || 50 || 1/4 || 25 || 3 || 11 || 14 || 1 || 4 || 2 || 0 || 0 || 13
|-
|13 ||align=left|Yunes Kawaid || 5 || 0/1 || 0 || 0/1 || 0 || 0/0 || 0 || 0 || 0 || 0 || 0 || 2 || 0 || 0 || 0 || 0
|-
|14 ||align=left|Ahmed Akber || 9 || 0/1 || 0 || 0/1 || 0 || 2/2 || 100 || 0 || 0 || 0 || 0 || 3 || 2 || 0 || 0 || 2
|-
|15 ||align=left|Ahmed Aman || 6 || 0/1 || 0 || 0/0 || 0 || 0/0 || 0 || 0 || 2 || 2 || 0 || 1 || 1 || 0 || 0 || 0
|-
|align=left colspan=2|Totals || 225 || 26/69 || 37.7 || 17/40 || 42.5 || 21/31 || 67.7 || 12 || 32 || 44 || 13 || 25 || 21 || 5 || 4 || 82
|}

Kazakhstan vs. Thailand

|-
|4 ||align=left|Timur Sultanov ||7||0/0||0||0/0||0||0/0||0||0||1||1||1||1||2||0||1||0
|-
|5 ||align=left|Jerry Jamar Johnson ||28||6/11||54.55||5/5||100||2/3||66.67||2||2||4||8||3||2||1||0||15 
|-
|6 ||align=left|Rustam Murzagaliyev ||27||4/8||50||1/2||50||2/4||50||2||1||3||3||1||2||0||0||13 
|-
|7 ||align=left|Mikhail Yevstigneyev ||colspan=16 align=left|Did not play
|-
|8 ||align=left|Vitaliy Lapchenko ||26||3/6||50||3/5||60||0/0||0||3||3||6||0||3||3||0||0||6 
|-
|9 ||align=left|Nikolay Bazhkin ||3||0/0||0||0/0||0||0/0||0||0||0||0||0||0||1||0||0||0
|-
|10 ||align=left|Konstantin Dvirnyy ||12||2/5||40||2/5||40||0/0||0||0||0||0||1||1||0||0||0||4 
|-
|11 ||align=left|Anton Ponomarev ||26||5/11||45.45||5/9||55.56||11/18||61.11||8||5||13||1||2||2||1||1||21
|-
|12 ||align=left|Dmitriy Klimov ||24||5/11||45.45||3/7||42.86||0/0||0||1||6||7||2||3||0||0||0||12 
|-
|13 ||align=left|Rustam Yargaliyev ||29||3/12||25||2/6||33.33||0/0||0||5||4||9||2||3||3||0||0||7 
|-
|14 ||align=left|Leonid Bondarovich ||colspan=16 align=left|Did not play 
|-
|15 ||align=left|Alexander Zhigulin ||14||1/3||33.33||0/1||0||0/0||0||3||2||5||0||2||2||0||0||3 
|-
|align=left colspan=2|Totals ||200||29/67||43.28||21/40||52.5||15/25||60||24||24||48||18||19||17||2||2||81
|}

|-
|4 ||align=left|Chanachon Klahan ||7||2/3||66.67||0/0||0||0/0||0||0||0||0||0||2||0||0||0||6 
|-
|5 ||align=left|Attaporn Lertmalaiporn ||16||0/1||0||0/1||0||0/0||0||0||0||0||2||0||3||0||0||0
|-
|6 ||align=left|Wattana Suttisin ||19||0/1||0||0/0||0||3/6||50||1||2||3||1||2||3||0||0||3 
|-
|7 ||align=left|Danai Kongkum ||23||2/4||50||2/4||50||2/2||100||0||3||3||2||1||2||1||0||6 
|-
|8 ||align=left|Wutipong Dasom ||11||0/1||0||0/1||0||2/2||100||0||1||1||1||2||1||1||0||2 
|-
|9 ||align=left|Anasawee Klaewnarong ||15||3/5||60||2/2||100||1/2||50||0||1||1||0||1||1||0||0||8 
|-
|10 ||align=left|Darongpan Apiromvilaichai ||17||4/7||57.14||4/7||57.14||1/2||50||0||2||2||1||1||5||0||0||9 
|-
|11 ||align=left|Darunpong Apiromvilaichai ||34||5/16||31.25||4/8||50||5/6||83||2||2||4||4||2||1||1||2||16 
|-
|12 ||align=left|Sukhdave Ghogar ||15||1/3||33.33||1/3||33.33||0/0||0||0||1||1||1||3||1||1||0 ||2 
|-
|13 ||align=left|Kannawat Lertlaokul ||16||4/5||80||3/4||75||0/0||0||1||1||2||1||3||1||0||0||9 
|-
|14 ||align=left|Kannut Samerjai ||1||0/0||0||0/0||0||0/0/||0||0||0||0||0||0||0||0||0||0 
|-
|15 ||align=left|Wacharapong Tongsri ||20||3/6||50||3/4||75||0/0||0||1||3||4||0||4||0||0||0||6 
|-
|align=left colspan=2|Totals ||200||24/52||46.15||19/34||55.88||14/20||70||5||16||21||13||21||18||4||2||67
|}

August 2

Kazakhstan vs. Bahrain

|-
|4 ||align=left|Timur Sultanov ||4||0/2||0/2||0/0||0||0/0||0||0||0||0||0||1||0||0||0||0 
|-
|5 ||align=left|Jerry Jamar Johnson ||40||5/13||38.46||4/7||57.14||7/8||87.5||1||6||7||8||2||1||2||0||18 
|-
|6 ||align=left|Rustam Murzagaliyev ||12||1/4||25||0/0||0||0/0||0||1||3||4||1||2||1||0||0||3 
|-
|7 ||align=left|Mikhail Yevstigneyev ||28||3/9||33.33||3/9||33.33||10/15||66.67||6||4||10||1||4||2||1||0||16 
|-
|8 ||align=left|Vitaliy Lapchenko ||12||1/5||20||1/4||25||0/0||0||2||0||2||1||2||1||0||0||2 
|-
|9 ||align=left|Nikolay Bazhkin ||colspan=16 align=left|Did not play 
|-
|10 ||align=left|Konstantin Dvirnyy ||35||3-9||33.33||3/5||60||6/6||100||3||2||5||2||4||1||2||0||12
|-
|11 ||align=left|Anton Ponomarev ||26||1/8||12.5||0/5||0||1/2||50||4||4||8||1||5||3||0||0||4  
|-
|12 ||align=left|Dmitriy Klimov ||22||2/6||33.33||1/2||50||0/0||0||1||4||5||0||4||1||2||0||5 
|-
|13 ||align=left|Rustam Yargaliyev ||33||7/14||50||2/4||50||0/0||0||1||4||5||1||4||4||0||1||19 
|-
|14 ||align=left|Leonid Bondarovich ||3||0/2||0||0/2||0||0/0||0||0||0||0||0||0||0||0||0||0 
|-
|15 ||align=left|Alexander Zhigulin ||6||0/1||0||0/1||0||0/0||0||0||1||1||0||4||0||0||0||0 
|-
|align=left colspan=2|Totals ||200||23/73||31.51||14/39||35.90||24/31||77.42||19||28||47||15||32||14||7||1||79
|}

|-
|4 ||align=left|Mohamed Ebrahim ||3||0/1||0||0/0||0||0/0||0||0||0||0||0||0||1||1||0||0
|-
|5 ||align=left|Hussain Al-Tawash ||18||0/5||0||0/2||0||0/0||0||0||1||1||1||2||3||0||0||0 
|-
|6 ||align=left|Mohamed Kawaid ||28||2/5||40||0/1||0||6/8||75||0||2||2||3||5||3||1||0||12 
|-
|7 ||align=left|Bader Malabes ||35||3/10||30||1/7||14.28||6/6||100||0||5||5||2||2||2||0||0||14 
|-
|8 ||align=left|Ahmed Ismaeel ||30||4/7||57.14||4/5||80||6/7||85.71||0||2||2||1||3||2||0||0||14 
|-
|9 ||align=left|Mohamed Alderazi ||38||3/10||30||2/5||40||3/3||100||1||4||5||2||2||3||2||0||10 
|-
|10 ||align=left|Ahmed Alderazi ||colspan=16 align=left|Did not play 
|-
|11 ||align=left|Subah Azzam ||15||3/3||100||2/2||100||0/0||0||1||3||4||1||1||2||0||0||7 
|-
|12 ||align=left|Chester Giles ||28||3/10||30||3/10||30||6/8||75||2||10||12||0||5||3||0||2||12 
|-
|13 ||align=left|Yunes Kawaid ||11||0/1||0||0/1||0||1/2||50||0||1||1||1||2||3||0||0||1 
|-
|14 ||align=left|Ahmed Akber ||14||2/3||66.67||2/3||66.67||2/3||66.67||2||0||2||0||3||0||0||0||6 
|-
|15 ||align=left|Ahmed Aman ||colspan=16 align=left|Did not play 
|-
|align=left colspan=2|Totals ||200||20/55||36.36||14/36||38.89||30/37||81.08||6||28||34||11||25||22||4||2||76
|}

Thailand vs. India

|-
|4 ||align=left|Chanachon Klahan ||9||2/7||28.57||0/3||0||3/5||60||1||1||2||0||1||1||0||0||9 
|-
|5 ||align=left|Attaporn Lertmalaiporn ||18||2/4||50||0/1||0||0/0||0||0||2||2||1||0||1||1||0||6 
|-
|6 ||align=left|Wattana Suttisin ||17||2/5||40||2/5||0||3/6||50||2||3||5||2||5||1||3||0||7 
|-
|7 ||align=left|Danai Kongkum ||22||4/10||40||4/8||50||0/0||0||1||2||3||3||4||4||0||0||8 
|-
|8 ||align=left|Wutipong Dasom ||14||2/4||50||2/4||50||0/0||0||2||1||3||0||1||3||0||0||4 
|-
|9 ||align=left|Anasawee Klaewnarong ||10||1/3||33.33||1/3||33.33||0/0||0||0||2||2||0||4||3||0||0||2 
|-
|10 ||align=left|Darongpan Apiromvilaichai ||14||3/7||42.86||3/7||42.86||0/1||0||1||1||2||0||0||5||0||0||6 
|-
|11 ||align=left|Darunpong Apiromvilaichai ||26||4/10||40||3/8||37.5||1/2||50||2||4||6||1||1||0||0||3||10 
|-
|12 ||align=left|Sukhdave Ghogar ||14||1/2||50||1/2||50||0/0||0||1||1||2||3||1||1||0||0||2 
|-
|13 ||align=left|Kannawat Lertlaokul ||17||2/7||28.57||2/4||50||0/0||0||2||3||5||1||1||1||0||2||4 
|-
|14 ||align=left|Kannut Samerjai ||3||0/0||0||0||0||0||0||0||0||0||0||0||0||0||0||0 
|-
|15 ||align=left|Wacharapong Tongsri ||30||3/9||33.33||3/9||33.33||1/2||50||1||3||4||0||3||0||0||0||7 
|-
|align=left colspan=2|Totals ||200||26.68||38.24||21/54||38.89||8/16||50||13||23||36||11||21||20||4||5||65
|}

|-
|4 ||align=left|Sambhaji Kadam ||7||0/0||0||0/0||0||0/0||0||2||0||2||0||0||0||0||0||0 
|-
|5 ||align=left|Narender Kumar Grewal ||30||10/20||50||9/16||56.25||3/5||60||4||2||6||1||2||1||0||0||24 
|-
|6 ||align=left|Pratham Singh ||6||0/0||0||0/0||0||1/2||50||1||1||2||0||1||0||0||0||1 
|-
|7 ||align=left|Vinay Kaushik ||8||1/3||33.33||0/1||0||0/0||0||1||0||1||1||1||1||0||0||3 
|-
|8 ||align=left|Arjun Singh ||3||0/2||0||0/2||0||1/4||25||2||1||3||1||0||1||0||0||1 
|-
|9 ||align=left|Vishesh Bhriguvanshi ||33||9/22||40.91||8/16||50||1/2||50||3||5||8||1||1||2||1||0||20 
|-
|10 ||align=left|Amritpal Singh ||15||3/7||42.86||3/6||50||3/4||75||2||5||7||1||3||2||0||0||9 
|-
|11 ||align=left|Joginder Singh ||29||4/10||40||1/2||50||2/2||100||1||3||4||4||2||1||2||0||13 
|-
|12 ||align=left|Satnam Singh Bhamara ||7||2/5||40||2/4||50||2/2||100||2||2||4||0||1||1||0||0||6 
|-
|13 ||align=left|Amjyot Singh ||18||2/2||100||2/2||100||4/6||66.67||3||5||8||0||3||5||0||2||8 
|-
|14 ||align=left|Yadwinder Singh ||23||1/5||20||1/5||20||0/0||0||5||4||9||0||3||2||1||1||2 
|-
|15 ||align=left|Rikin Shantilal Pethani ||17||1/5||20||1/5||20||0/2||0||2||4||6||1||1||3||0||3||2 
|-
|align=left colspan=2|Totals ||200||33/81||40.74||27/59||45.76||17/29||58.62||28||32||60||10||18||19||4||6||89
|}

August 3

India vs. Kazakhstan

|-
|4 ||align=left|Sambhaji Kadam ||colspan=16 align=left|Did not play 
|-
|5 ||align=left|Narender Kumar Grewal ||37||6/14||42.86||4/8||50||0/0||0||1||2||3||1||2||2||0||0||14 
|-
|6 ||align=left|Pratham Singh ||10||1/1||100||1/1||100||0/0||0||0||0||0||0||1||1||1||0||2 
|-
|7 ||align=left|Vinay Kaushik ||colspan=16 align=left|Did not play  
|-
|8 ||align=left|Arjun Singh ||6||0/1||0||0/0||0||1/2||50||1||1||2||1||0||1||0||0||1 
|-
|9 ||align=left|Vishesh Bhriguvanshi ||37||7/11||63.64||4/7||57.14||2/3||66.67||0||6||6||5||4||2||0||0||19 
|-
|10 ||align=left|Amritpal Singh ||22||1/4||25||1/4||25||2/4||50||1||3||4||0||4||3||0||3||4 
|-
|11 ||align=left|Joginder Singh ||27||4/8||50||3/4||75||1/2||50||2||3||5||1||1||6||0||0||10 
|-
|12 ||align=left|Satnam Singh Bhamara ||10||4/5||80||4/5||80||0/1||0||2||2||4||0||2||0||0||0||8 
|-
|13 ||align=left|Amjyot Singh ||30||2/6||33.33||2/6||33.33||1/2||50||5||0||5||1||4||4||0||2||5 
|-
|14 ||align=left|Yadwinder Singh ||10||1/3||33.33||1/1||100||2/2||100||0||2||2||1||1||1||0||0||4 
|-
|15 ||align=left|Rikin Shantilal Pethani ||6||0/1||0||0/1||0||0/0||0||0||0||0||0||0||0||0||0||0
|-
|align=left colspan=2|Totals ||200||26/54||48.15||20/37||54.05||9/16||56.25||12||19||31||10||19||20||1||5||67
|}

|-
|4 ||align=left|Timur Sultanov ||16||0/2||0||0/0||0||0/0||0||0||2||2||2||2||0||1||0||0 
|-
|5 ||align=left|Jerry Jamar Johnson ||30||6/12||50||4/7||57.14||2/2||100||2||2||4||6||1||2||1||0||19 
|-
|6 ||align=left|Rustam Murzagaliyev ||13||0/1||0||0/1||0||0/0||0||1||1||2||3||2||0||0||0||0 
|-
|7 ||align=left|Mikhail Yevstigneyev ||18||7/11||63.64||6/9||66.67||6/7||85.71||2||2||4||0||5||3||1||0||21 
|-
|8 ||align=left|Vitaliy Lapchenko ||20||4/8||50||4/8||50||0/0||0||2||1||3||0||2||1||1||0||8 
|-
|9 ||align=left|Nikolay Bazhkin ||colspan=16 align=left|Did not play 
|-
|10 ||align=left|Konstantin Dvirnyy ||colspan=16 align=left|Did not play 
|-
|11 ||align=left|Anton Ponomarev ||25||2/9||22.22||1/6||16.67||6/8||75||4||3||7||0||1||1||0||1||11 
|-
|12 ||align=left|Dmitriy Klimov ||26||3/11||27.28||3/7||42.86||0/0||0||3||2||5||4||1||2||1||0||6 
|-
|13 ||align=left|Rustam Yargaliyev ||32||6/11||54.55||5/9||55.56||0/0||0||1||2||3||3||0||3||1||0||13 
|-
|14 ||align=left|Leonid Bondarovich ||8||1/3||33||1/3||33||0/0||0||1||2||3||0||3||0||0||0||2 
|-
|15 ||align=left|Alexander Zhigulin ||7||1/2||50||0/0||0||0/0||0||1||0||1||1||1||0||0||0||3 
|-
|align=left colspan=2|Totals ||200||30/70||42.86||24/50||48||14/17||82.35||17||17||34||19||18||12||6||1||80
|}

Bahrain vs. Thailand

|-
|4 ||align=left|Mohamed Ebrahim ||colspan=16 align=left|Did not play 
|-
|5 ||align=left|Hussain Al-Tawash ||22||4/8||50||4/7||57.14||3/3||100||1||3||4||3||1||0||1||0||11 
|-
|6 ||align=left|Mohamed Kawaid ||11||0/2||0||0/2||0||0/0||0||0||0||0||2||1||0||1||0||0 
|-
|7 ||align=left|Bader Malabes ||21||0/4||0||0/2||0||0/0||0||0||4||4||2||3||2||0||0||0 
|-
|8 ||align=left|Ahmed Ismaeel ||30||4/10||40||3/6||50||2/3||66.67||0||0||0||3||3||2||0||0||11 
|-
|9 ||align=left|Mohamed Alderazi ||32||8/14||57.14||5/8||62.5||2/2||100||0||3||3||3||1||5||1||0||21 
|-
|10 ||align=left|Ahmed ALderazi ||colspan=16 align=left|Did not play 
|-
|11 ||align=left|Subah Azzam ||14||2/2||100||2/2||100||0/0||0||1||5||6||0||5||0||0||0||4 
|-
|12 ||align=left|Chester Giles ||22||4/9||44.44||4/9||44.44||10/13||76.92||7||11||18||0||2||4||0||0||18 
|-
|13 ||align=left|Yunes Kawaid ||11||0/2||0||0/2||0||0/0||0||0||0||0||2||1||0||1||0||0 
|-
|14 ||align=left|Ahmed Akber ||17||4/4||100||4/4||100||1/2||50||3||0||3||0||3||2||0||1||9 
|-
|15 ||align=left|Ahmed Aman ||colspan=16 align=left|Did not play 
|-
|align=left colspan=2|Totals ||200||30/61||49.18||26/46||56.52||22/27||81.48||12||32||44||16||20||17||3||3||86
|}

|-
|4 ||align=left|Chanachon Klahan ||14||0/4||0||0/0||0||3/5||60||0||1||1||0||1||0||0||0||3 
|-
|5 ||align=left|Attaporn Lertmalaiporn ||28||4/9||44.44||1/3||33.33||0/0||0||0||4||4||1||1||1||1||0||11 
|-
|6 ||align=left|Wattana Suttisin ||colspan=16 align=left|Did not play 
|-
|7 ||align=left|Danai Kongkum ||13||1/4||25||1/4||25||0/0||0||0||0||0||1||1||2||2||0||2 
|-
|8 ||align=left|Wutipong Dasom ||28||2/7||28.57||2/7||28.57||1/2||50||1||0||1||3||3||1||1||0||5 
|-
|9 ||align=left|Anasawee Klaewnarong ||21||3/9||33.33||2/4||50||2/2||100||1||5||6||0||4||3||1||2||9 
|-
|10 ||align=left|Darongpan Apiromvilaichai ||21||1/5||20||1/3||33.33||3/5||60||2||1||3||0||1||0||0||0||5 
|-
|11 ||align=left|Darunpong Apiromvilaichai ||22||1/13||7.69||0/6||0||3/4||75||4||3||7||1||1||1||0||0||6 
|-
|12 ||align=left|Sukhdave Ghogar ||12||2/5||40||2/4||50||0/0||0||3||2||5||1||4||0||0||0||4 
|-
|13 ||align=left|Kannawat Lertlaokul ||12||4/5||80||4/5||80||3/6||50||2||0||2||1||3||0||1||0||11 
|-
|14 ||align=left|Kannut Samerjai ||2||0/1||0||0/1||0||0/0||0||0||0||0||0||0||0||0||0||0 
|-
|15 ||align=left|Wacharapong Tongsri ||21||2/6||33.33||2/6||33.33||2/2||100||1||3||4||1||1||0||0||0||6 
|-
|align=left colspan=2|Totals ||200||20/68||29.41||15/43||34.88||17/26||65.38||14||19||33||9||20||8||6||2||62
|}

Group D
2013–14 in Kazakhstani basketball
2013–14 in Thai basketball
2013 in Indian sport
2013 in Bahraini sport